The saberfin killie (Terranatos dolichopterus) is a species of killifish from the family Rivulidae endemic to the Orinoco River basin of Venezuela. This species is the only known member of its genus. This species is also found in the aquarium trade.

References

Rivulidae
Monotypic fish genera
Taxa named by Stanley Howard Weitzman
Fish described in 1967